Vyshinsky is the Russian and Ukrainian form of the Polish family name Wyszyński. It corresponds with the Lithuanian name Višinskis. Notable people with the surname include:

Andrey Yanuaryevich Vyshinsky (1883–1953), Soviet politician, jurist and diplomat
Kirill Valeryevich Vyshinsky (born 1967), Ukrainian and Russian journalist

Russian-language surnames